Harvard Forest is an ecological research area of  owned and managed by Harvard University and located in Petersham, Massachusetts. The property, in operation since 1907, includes one of North America's oldest managed forests, educational and research facilities, a museum, and recreation trails. Harvard Forest is open to the public.

Research and education
Harvard University conducts forest biology and conservation research on the property, including two major programs: the Long Term Ecological Research LTER program, funded by the National Science Foundation and established in 1988 to investigate New England's natural ecosystem; and the National Institute of Global Environmental Change program established and funded by the United States Department of Energy and emphasizing the study of physical and biological processes in relation to climate change. Harvard Forest is also slated to be the northeastern core site of the National Ecological Observatory Network.  A number of smaller research programs are also conducted in Harvard Forest. This includes the Schoolyard LTER program, which allows K-12 classrooms to participate in the collection and analysis of environmental data

Soils
The forest is mostly supported by stony sandy loam podzol soils developed on glacial till and most commonly mapped as Berkshire, Becket, Skerry, Peru, and Marlow series. However, the classic podzol banded appearance is absent from many profiles due to obliteration of the pale eluvial (A2 or E) horizon by earthworm activity, which was noted in Harvard Forest in the 1920s.

The Fisher Museum
The Fisher Museum, open on weekends, offers exhibits on current research as well as twenty-three model dioramas portraying the history, conservation and management of New England woodlands. A sixty-seat lecture hall is located in the museum.

Harvard Forest staff and students conduct educational programs and guided natural history tours for adults and children. Self-guided interpretive trails are located on the property, as well as several miles of primitive roads and trails, open to the public for non motorized recreation including hiking, wildlife observation, mountain biking, cross country skiing, hunting (in season) and similar passive pursuits. Camping, fires, and motorized vehicles are not allowed. An observation tower is located on the forest's Prospect Hill Tract.

The Fisher Museum and primary trailhead are located on Massachusetts Route 32 north of Petersham center.

References

External links
Map of Harvard Forest's Prospect Hill Tract
Harvard University
Map of Brooks Woodland Preserve.
Rutland Brook Sanctuary
Harvard Forest
Harvard Forest Research topics
The Fisher Museum and trails
Harvard Forest Dioramas with high resolution images for download

Harvard University
Protected areas of Worcester County, Massachusetts
Forests of Massachusetts
Museums in Worcester County, Massachusetts
Forestry museums in the United States
Petersham, Massachusetts
Research forests
Protected areas established in 1907
1907 establishments in Massachusetts